The 1876 United States House of Representatives elections in South Carolina were held on November 7, 1876 to select five Representatives for two-year terms from the state of South Carolina.  Two incumbents were re-elected, one was defeated for re-election, and the Democrats picked up one of the two open seats from the Republicans.  The composition of the state delegation after the election was three Republicans and two Democrats.

1st congressional district
Incumbent Republican Congressman Joseph Rainey of the 1st congressional district, in office since 1870, defeated Democratic challenger John S. Richardson.

General election results

|-
| 
| colspan=5 |Republican hold
|-

2nd congressional district special election
The Congress declared the seat for the 2nd congressional district vacant on July 19, 1876 after Charles W. Buttz successfully contested the 1874 election.  A special election was called to be held simultaneously with the regular election.  Charles W. Buttz was nominated by the Republicans and he defeated Democrat Michael P. O'Connor in the special election.

General election results

|-
| 
| colspan=5 |Republican gain from Independent Republican
|-

2nd congressional district
Richard H. Cain was nominated by the Republicans for the regular election of the 2nd congressional district and he defeated Democratic challenger Michael P. O'Connor.

General election results

|-
| 
| colspan=5 |Republican hold
|-

3rd congressional district
Incumbent Republican Congressman Solomon L. Hoge of the 3rd congressional district, in office since 1875, declined to seek re-election.  D. Wyatt Aiken was nominated by the Democrats and he defeated Republican Lewis C. Carpenter.

General election results

|-
| 
| colspan=5 |Democratic gain from Republican
|-

4th congressional district
Incumbent Republican Congressman Alexander S. Wallace of the 4th congressional district, in office since 1870, was defeated by Democratic challenger John H. Evins.

General election results

|-
| 
| colspan=5 |Democratic gain from Republican
|-

5th congressional district
Incumbent Republican Congressman Robert Smalls of the 5th congressional district, in office since 1875, defeated Democratic challenger George D. Tillman.

General election results

|-
| 
| colspan=5 |Republican hold
|-

See also
United States House of Representatives elections, 1876
South Carolina gubernatorial election, 1876
South Carolina's congressional districts

References
"Annual Report of the Secretary of State to the General Assembly of South Carolina." Reports and Resolutions of the General Assembly of the State of South Carolina at the Regular Session, 1876-77. Columbia, SC: Republican Printing Company, 1877, pp. 217–219.

South Carolina
1876
South Carolina